The 2016 Campeonato Nacional Apertura Scotiabank  was the 99th Chilean League top flight, in which Universidad Católica won its 12th league title, their second in a row.

Standings

Results

Title

Pre-Copa Libertadores playoff
The pre-Copa Libertadores playoff was played between:
O'Higgins (2016 Clausura third place)
Unión Española (2016 Apertura third place)

The winner qualified for the 2017 Copa Libertadores second stage, while the loser qualified for the 2017 Copa Sudamericana first stage.

Top goalscorers

Source: Soccerway

References

External links
ANFP 

2016–17 Campeonato Nacional season
2016–17 in Chilean football
2016 in South American football leagues
Primera División de Chile seasons